Paul Frank Martinez (born 6 October 1947, Leicester, Leicestershire, England) is a British session musician and songwriter, best known for his work with Robert Plant, Cat Stevens, Jackie Edwards, Dave Edmunds, George Harrison, Maggie Bell, Vasco Rossi, Peter Gabriel, Chicken Shack, The Adverts, among others.

On 13 July 1985, when Page, Plant, and Jones reunited for the Live Aid concert at JFK Stadium, Philadelphia, Martinez played bass alongside drummers Tony Thompson and Phil Collins.

Martinez played bass guitar on the only album released by Paice Ashton Lord, Malice in Wonderland.

Discography
 Jerry Byrd, Christmas in Hawaii (Lehua, 1987)
 Tom Cochrane and Red Rider, Tom Cochrane and Red Rider (Capitol, 1986)
 Mark Oliver Everett, Broken Toy Shop (Polydor, 1993)
 Groove Holmes, Night Glider (Groove Merchant, 1973)
 The Honeydrippers, Volume One (Es Paranza, 2007)
 Paice Ashton Lord, Malice in Wonderland (1977)
 Louisiana Red, Louisiana Red Sings the Blues (Atco, 1972)
 John Otway, Where Did I Go Right? (Polydor, 1979)
 Robert Plant, Pictures at Eleven (Swan Song, 1982)
 Robert Plant, The Principle of Moments (Es Paranza, 1983)
 Robert Plant, Shaken 'n' Stirred (Es Paranza, 1985)
 Patty Pravo, Patty Pravo (RCA, 1998)
 Patty Pravo, Tanto (RCA, 1976)
 Bernard Purdie, Soul Is... Pretty Purdie (Flying Dutchman, 1972)
 Renaissance, A Song for All Seasons (Warner Bros., 1978)
 Dakota Staton, Madame Foo-Foo (Groove Merchant, 1972)
 Cat Stevens, Foreigner (Island, 1973)
 Meic Stevens, Gwymon (Wren, 1972)
 Richard Strange, The Live Rise of Richard Strange (PVC, 1980)
 Stretch, Elastique (Anchor, 1975)
 Stretch, Why Did You Do It (Ariola, 1985)
 Johnny Warman, Hour Glass (Angel Air, 2005)
 Stan Webb, The Creeper (Ariola, 1978)
 You, Me, and Everyone We Know, Party for the Grown and Sexy (Rushmore, 2008)

References

External links
 

English session musicians
English rock bass guitarists
Male bass guitarists
Living people
1947 births
People from Casablanca
English people of Moroccan descent
Chicken Shack members
Stretch (band) members
Paice Ashton Lord members